C. W. Harris is a name referring to the following people:

 Carolyn Wilson Harris (1849–1910), American lichenologist
 Curtis West Harris (1924–2017), African-American minister, civil rights activist, and politician